Arusha Secondary School is a secondary school in Arusha, Tanzania, the first school in Tanzania to be headed by a Tanzanian woman educated in the United States.

In 2018 the school had 800 female students.

References

External links
  ACSEE 2017 EXAMINATION RESULTS S0302 ARUSHA SECONDARY SCHOOL  - National Examinations Council of Tanzania

Secondary schools in Tanzania
Education in Arusha
Girls' schools in Tanzania